Keble College Boat Club (KCBC) is the rowing club of Keble College, in Oxford, United Kingdom. The boat club is based in its boathouse on the Isis, which is shared with Jesus College. Most of the year is spent training at the boat club's second facility at the Godstow stretch to the North.

History
In Summer Eights, the men have held the Headship on eight occasions, most recently in 2018. Both the men's and women's 1st VIII crews have consistently raced in the top division of Summer Eights, and the men's first boat is now third position on the river. The women's boat is now eighth position on the river, after reaching a peak of 5th on the river in 2017. The second and third boats regularly achieve blades in lower divisions.

In Torpids, while Keble has not yet achieved the Men's or the Women's headship, both first boats have enjoyed periods of success, especially in recent years. The women's first Torpid is currently at a peak of 5th on the River, after bumping in fourteen consecutive races. The highest position the Men have held was 2nd on the river, last held in 1988, before dropping to 33rd on the river, the position they occupied at the end of 2013 racing. Since then, they have risen 22 places across 18 races (2014 races & two days of 2018 races being cancelled), up to 11th on the river, achieving blades four times in their last five Torpids campaigns.

The Women's first Torpid represented Oxford at the Henley Boat Races inter-collegiate race in 2017, where they defeated Jesus College, Cambridge. They were also selected to represent Oxford in 2018, but the race was unfortunately cancelled.

Three Keblites occupied boat race crews in the 2017 Cancer Research UK Boat Race crews. Olympic gold medallist Ed Coode rowed for the college 1st VIII during his time at Keble in the late 1990s.

Training, equipment, and fleet
KCBC is sponsored by Neptune Investment Management, providing funds for new boats and other equipment of a regular basis. In addition to the water training, the boat club uses the college gym and its own erg room.

Coaching
Several high-class coaches are looking after both senior boats and novice rowers. Recent coaches include among others Harry Brightmore and Freddie Davidson, as well as Tim Foster, who also rowed for Keble.

Fleet

There are also a number of fours, pairs, doubles, and singles available to students, who routinely train and enter fours and small boats into regattas in Michaelmas term.

Honours

Henley Royal Regatta

See also
University rowing (UK)
Keble College, University of Oxford

References

External links
Keble College Boat Club
Oxford University Rowing Clubs
A General History of Oxford College Rowing
Oxford Bumps Charts

Rowing clubs of the University of Oxford
Boat Club
1870 establishments in England
Sports clubs established in the 1870s
Rowing clubs in Oxfordshire
Rowing clubs of the River Thames